The following article presents a summary of the 2001–02 football (soccer) season in Croatia, which was the 11th season of competitive football in the country.

League tables

Prva HNL

Relegation play-offs
First legs were held on 15 May and second legs on 19 May, 2002.

Druga HNL

North Division

South Division

References